Delphinium variegatum is a species of larkspur known by the common name royal larkspur. It is endemic to California, where it grows in mountains, valley and coast in woodlands and grasslands. On the forest floor of California oak woodlands typical plant associates are Calochortus luteus, Cynoglossum grande and Calochortus amabilis.

Description
This erect wildflower may reach half a meter in maximum height. Its leaves have deep lobes which may overlap. The long petioles are hairy. The branching inflorescence holds up to 25 widely spaced flowers, which are usually bright deep blue, and occasionally lighter blue or white, depending on subspecies. The spur is between one and two centimeters long.

Subspecies
There are three generally accepted subspecies. 
ssp. kinkiense
ssp. thornei
ssp. kinkiensis

Two of them, ssp. kinkiense and ssp. thornei, are endemic to San Clemente Island, one of the Channel Islands of California. Ssp. kinkiensis, which is sometimes called Delphinium kinkiense ssp. kinkiense, is treated as a federally listed endangered species. Although it is in fact rarer than ssp. kinkiensis, ssp. thornei does not have a federal or state listing.

Unlike the other two subspecies, ssp. kinkiensis sometimes bears white flowers. Blue-flowered individuals are difficult to differentiate from ssp. thornei.

Notes

References
 California Native Plant Society Rare Plant Profile
 Center for Plant Conservation: ssp. thornei
 C. Michael Hogan. 2009. Gold Nuggets: Calochortus luteus, GlobalTwitcher.com, ed. N. Stromberg
 Jepson Manual. 1993. Delphinium variegatum

External links
Calflora Database: Delphinium variegatum (royal larkspur)
  Jepson eFlora (TJM2): Delphinium variegatum
Center for Plant Conservation: Delphinium variegatum ssp. kinkiensis
UC Photos gallery − Delphinium variegatum

variegatum
Endemic flora of California
Flora of the Sierra Nevada (United States)
Natural history of the California chaparral and woodlands
Natural history of the California Coast Ranges
Natural history of the Central Valley (California)
Critically endangered flora of California
Flora without expected TNC conservation status